Kenneth Edward Olin (born July 30, 1954) is an American actor, television director, and producer. He is known for his role as Michael Steadman in the ABC drama series Thirtysomething (1987–1991), for which he received a Golden Globe Award for Best Actor – Television Series Drama nomination in 1990. Olin later began working as television director and producer. His producer credits include Alias (2001–2006), Brothers & Sisters (2006–2011), and This Is Us (2016-2022). Olin is married to actress Patricia Wettig.

Career

Acting
Olin began appearing on television as of late 1970's. His first series regular role was on the short-lived NBC comedy-drama Bay City Blues in 1983. He later joined the cast of NBC police drama Hill Street Blues playing Detective Harry Garibaldi from 1984 to 1985, and from 1985 to 1986 co-starred on the CBS prime time soap opera Falcon Crest as Father Christopher Rossini. Olin also guest-starred on Murder, She Wrote and Hotel, before was cast as Michael Steadman in the ABC drama series, Thirtysomething. Debuting in 1987, the series received critical acclaim, setting a new bar for realism in the realm of prime-time drama. For his performance, Olin was nominated for Golden Globe Award for Best Actor – Television Series Drama in 1990.

In 1996, Olin played a leading role in the short-lived CBS crime drama EZ Streets. From 1998 to 1999, he played the leading role in the another short-lived CBS series, medical drama L.A. Doctors. He starred opposite his wife, Patricia Wettig in the 1995 television film Nothing But the Truth, and well as in Telling Secrets (1993) with Cybill Shepherd, The Advocate's Devil (1997) alongside Mariska Hargitay, and Evolution's Child (1999). His film credits include roles in Ghost Story (1981), Queens Logic (1991), and 'Til There Was You (1997).

From 2007 to 2011, Olin had a recurring role opposite Patricia Wettig in the ABC drama series Brothers & Sisters. From 2015 to 2017, he had a recurring role in the CBS drama series, Zoo. In 2020, ABC ordered a sequel for Thirtysomething and Olin is set to return alongside Mel Harris, Timothy Busfield and Patricia Wettig.

Producing and directing
In the summer of 1990, Olin directed his wife in a production of "My Mother Said I Never Should" at the Powerhouse Theatre at Vassar College. Prior this, he directed six episodes of Thirtysomething. He directed television movies The Broken Cord (1992), Doing Time on Maple Drive (1992), In Pursuit of Honor (1995) and Phenomenon II (2003). He also directed White Fang 2: Myth of the White Wolf (1994) for Buena Vista Pictures. He directed episodes of L.A. Doctors, Judging Amy, Felicity, The West Wing, 23 episodes of Alias, 20 episodes of Brothers & Sisters, Sleepy Hollow, and 20 episodes of This Is Us.

Olin was executive producer of number of television dramas in 2000s and 2010s. First was ABC action drama Alias (2001-2006). From 2006 to 2011, he produced ABC family drama Brothers & Sisters featuring ensemble cast led by Sally Field. His wife, Patricia Wettig also was regular cast member. His other credits include Breaking News (2002), The Mob Doctor (2012-2013) and Sleepy Hollow. In 2016, he began producing NBC family drama This Is Us, which received four Primetime Emmy Award for Outstanding Drama Series nominations during its run.

Personal life
Olin was born to a Jewish family in Chicago, Illinois, the son of a former Peace Corps official and pharmaceutical company owner. He was raised in Highland Park, Illinois. He graduated from The Putney School in Putney, Vermont, in 1972. He then completed his college career at the University of Pennsylvania. He is married to thirtysomething co-star, Patricia Wettig, with whom he has a son, Clifford, and a daughter, Roxanne, who appears on The City.

Filmography

as Actor

as Director

as Producer

References

External links
 
 

1954 births
Living people
Male actors from Chicago
American male film actors
American film directors
American male television actors
American television directors
Circle in the Square Theatre School alumni
Jewish American male actors
University of Pennsylvania alumni
The Putney School alumni
21st-century American Jews
20th-century American Jews